"Heading Up High" is a song by Dutch disc jockey and record producer Armin van Buuren. It features the Dutch band Kensington. The track was released in the Netherlands by Armind as a digital download on 5 February 2016 as the fourth single from van Buuren's sixth album Embrace.

The First State remix of the song was more often played by Armin van Buuren during his shows.

Background and release 
Armin van Buuren declared about the song “I wanted to create a song that was just totally unexpected and I’d been drawn to the sound of Kensington for some time. We really vibed well together and I think my long-time dance music fans may be surprised by some elements of this song. It just really soars and I get a great reaction whenever I play it out! It’s got the feel of worlds coming together.”

Reception 
According to Amanda Mesa from webmedia Dancing Astronaut, "Infectious and high-energy, “Heading Up High” is yet another example of Embrace’s genre-fluidity. [...] Overall, “Heading Up High” is a roller coaster across intense highs and lows that’ll leave you hanging on for more."

Music video 
A music video to accompany the release of "Heading Up High" was first premired worldwide by MTV on 9 February 2016. The music video shows a live performance by both Armin van Buuren & Kensington in a prison populated by inmates. Hardwell appears as one of the prisoners of the video. The song encourages the captives literally to head up high towards a loophole.

Track listing 
 Netherlands Digital download 
 "Heading Up High" – 3:52
 "Heading Up High" (Dimitri Vegas & Like Mike vs. BOOSTEDKIDS Radio Edit) – 2:34
 "Heading Up High" (Years Radio Edit) – 4:04
 "Heading Up High" (First State Radio Edit) – 3:52
 "Heading Up High" (Dimitri Vegas & Like Mike vs. BOOSTEDKIDS Remix) – 5:21
 "Heading Up High" (Years Remix) – 5:40
 "Heading Up High" (First State Remix) – 5:52

Charts

Certifications

References 

2016 singles
2016 songs
Armin van Buuren songs
Songs written by Armin van Buuren
Songs written by Benno de Goeij
Armada Music singles